Roberto Veglia (born 16 April 1957) is a former Italian long jumper who competed at the 1976 Summer Olympics.

References

External links
 

1957 births
Athletes (track and field) at the 1976 Summer Olympics
Italian male long jumpers
Olympic athletes of Italy
Living people